Ape in Pink Marble is the ninth studio album by folk rock musician Devendra Banhart, released on September 23, 2016 on Nonesuch Records. The album was written, produced, arranged, and recorded in Los Angeles by the singer/songwriter/guitarist with his longtime collaborators Noah Georgeson and Josiah Steinbrick, both of whom also worked on Banhart's previous album, Mala (2013).

Background 
The record was finished, as was stated in a recent interview, in early May 2016. A couple of weeks after that, Banhart posted on Instagram that the album's recording and mixing was done. The album was announced on June 24, 2016, along with the first track, 'Middle Names', the opening track of the album.

Music and lyrics 
According to a recent concert review, the album contains lyrics such as:
"Love, don’t you worry
Even though it’s time to go.
There is no one that I love
And that no one is you."

Critical reception 

Ape in Pink Marble received a generally positive reception from music critics. At Metacritic, which assigns a "weighted average" score to ratings and reviews from selected mainstream critics, the Metascore is 78, which is based on 14 critical reviews.

Marcy Donelson from AllMusic stated, "The album's overall effect is one of strolling along a seaside path, maybe with a stray dog and a straw hat, in a less-frequented village somewhere far from home, and it's one of Banhart's most satisfying."

Track listing

Charts

References 

2013 albums
Devendra Banhart albums
Nonesuch Records albums
Indie folk albums by American artists